"The Swimmer" is a short story by American author John Cheever, originally published in The New Yorker on July 18, 1964, and then in the 1964 short fiction collection The Brigadier and the Golf Widow. 

The story was collected in The Stories of John Cheever (1978), published by Alfred A. Knopf.

Considered one of Cheever's most outstanding works, "The Swimmer" has received exhaustive analysis from critics and biographers.
 
In 1968, "The Swimmer" was adapted into a film of the same name, starring Burt Lancaster. This is the only literary work by Cheever that has appeared on screen.

Plot
The story is told from a third-person omniscient point-of-view, in which the focal character is Neddy Merrill, a suburban resident of the New York State County of Westchester, spanning two of Cheever's fictional communities of Shady Hill and Bullet Park.

Neddy Merrill is lounging poolside at the residence of his well-to-do neighbors, the Westerhazys. By all appearances, he is entering a robust middle-age, and though in the twilight of his youth, appears to possess a supreme optimism.
On a whim, he conceives of returning to his home, located eight miles on the other side of the county, by way of the swimming pools at the homes of fourteen suburbanite couples, all friends or acquaintances of Neddy. Styling himself a new-age "explorer,” he dubs the series of pools the "Lucinda River" in honor of his wife. 

Initially, the journey progresses splendidly. He is greeted warmly by friends and associates, male and female. He imbibes alcoholic beverages along the way. Despite the ever-present afternoon light, it becomes unclear how much time has passed: at the beginning of the story it is clearly midsummer, but eventually all natural signs point to the season being autumn. The story's tone gradually becomes sinister and  surreal. Threatening storm clouds gather.

Midway through his aquatic journey, some of Neddy's friends mention his serious financial misfortunes although he seems unaware of these. He meets with undisguised hostility at the poolside party of the Biswangers, a couple whom Neddy and his wife Lucinda have persistently snubbed socially. At the home of Eric Sachs, one of Neddy's closest friends, he is informed by Sachs's wife that Eric survived a life-threatening operation three years previous: Neddy has absolutely no recollection of Eric's illness. At the pool of Neddy's discarded mistress, Shirley Adams, she informs him she won't lend him any more money or serve him a drink, and dismisses him. Neddy proceeds on his increasingly grim odyssey.

Neddy's physical strength declines precipitously, and it becomes painful for him to swim the length of each pool. Neddy is further disoriented when he feels a chill in the air, and notices, in the darkening skies, the constellations of autumn rather than summer. The normally stoic swimmer begins to weep.

Finally, Neddy staggers to his home only to discover that the doors are locked: The house is empty and long deserted.

Background
Some scholars believe the story, originally conceived as a novel and pared down from over 150 pages of notes, is Cheever's most famous and frequently anthologized. As published, the story is highly praised for its blend of realism and surrealism, the thematic exploration of suburban America, especially the relationship between wealth and happiness, as well as his use of myth and symbolism.

According to critic Scott Donaldson, the composition of "The Swimmer" was a protracted struggle which occupied Cheever for two months.
He described the "terribly difficult" ordeal in an interview with Alexandra Grant:

Donaldson reports that "it was the last story he wrote for a long time."

Critical assessment
"The Swimmer" is widely regarded as one of Cheever's "genuine masterpieces" and perhaps the finest piece of short fiction in his oeuvre. The work is frequently found in anthologies.
Biographer Scott Donaldson writes that "The Swimmer" has received "as much critical attention as anything Cheever wrote, and deservedly so, since it is beautifully crafted and carries a powerful emotional charge."

W. B. Gooderham of The New York Times writes: "Cheever's greatest short story transcends its influences and any autobiographical frisson to emerge as a quietly devastating journey into one man's heart of darkness. And as a piece of prose it is as near-miraculous as the journey it describes…"

Theme
Cheever's conception for the story was originally a straightforward and unambiguous invocation of the Greek myth of Narcissus.

Cheever recalled: 

Cheever deepened the metaphoric and mythic elements. Biographer Patrick Meanor identifies several layers of ancient myth and legend in Cheever's story. Among these are Arthurian quest for the Holy Grail and the Fisher King, the Homeric tale of Odysseus, and a Dante-like descent into the netherworld.

Meanor also notes "an ethnic arrangement" for the names of the couples Neddy Merrill encounters on his fateful trek, beginning with Scots and English surnames of  WASPs, then to surnames associated with "German to the Jewish to the Irish." Meanor also detects a highly crafted "water metaphor" in the  ontological roots of these names.

Literary critic Lynne Waldeland notes that the significance of Neddy Merrill's "Lucinda River" is no mere juvenile escapade, and Cheever makes this explicit in the story's narrative: "He was not a practical joker nor was he a fool but he was determinedly an original and he had a vague and modest idea of himself as a legendary figure." Waldeland concludes that "the real point of the story is the celebratory motive of Neddy's act with the social realities that emerge as the story progresses, realities that have to do with the role wealth and social status play in the world which Neddy wishes to invest with legendary beauty and meaning...Whatever "happened" we have seen a brightly lit, intelligible, comfortable world suddenly become dark and cold. The story, like a nightmare, leaves the reader with a residual uneasiness."

Literary critic Samuel Coale observes that "The Swimmer" confronts both his protagonist and the reader with a shocking epiphany:

Footnotes

Sources 
Bailey, Blake. 2009 (1). Notes on Text in John Cheever: Collected Stories and Other Writing. The Library of America. Pp.1025-1028 
Bailey, Blake. 2009 (2). Cheever: A Life. Alfred A. Knopf, New York. 770 pp. 
Coale, Samuel. 1977. John Cheever. Frederick Ungar Publishing Company, New York. 
Donaldson, Scott. 1988. John Cheever: A Biography. Random House, New York. 

Meanor, Patrick. 1995. John Cheever Revisited. Twayne Publishers, New York. 
O'Hara, James E. 1989. John Cheever: A Study of the Short Fiction. Twayne Publishers, Boston Massachusetts. Twayne Studies in Short Fiction no 9. 
Waldeland, Lynne. 1979. John Cheever. Twayne Publishers, G. K. Hall & Company, Boston, Massachusetts.

Bibliography

External links
 "The Swimmer" by John Cheever

1964 short stories
Short stories adapted into films
Short stories by John Cheever
Works originally published in The New Yorker